Old Treasury Building is a name used for many buildings including;

 Treasury Building, Brisbane built 1886 - 1928 in stages
 Old Treasury Building, Melbourne built 1858-62
 Old Treasury Building, Perth